To the Best of Our Knowledge (also known by the acronym TTBOOK) is a weekly public-radio interview program produced by Wisconsin Public Radio and distributed by PRX. It is broadcast on more than 180 public radio stations in the U.S. and it also is available as a podcast. Until his retirement in January 2014, Jim Fleming hosted the program, along with interviewers Steve Paulson and Anne Strainchamps. After Fleming's retirement, Strainchamps took over as host.

Program format 
To the Best of Our Knowledge produces two one-hour programs each week. Each hour has a theme that is explored over the course of the hour, primarily through interviews, although the show also airs commentaries, performance pieces, and occasional reporter pieces. Topics vary widely, from contemporary politics, science, and "big ideas", to pop culture themes such as "Nerds" or "Apocalyptic Fiction".

The program produces at least one five-part series every year that tends to be distributed more widely than the weekly broadcast. "East Meets West", a series on East-West cultural crossroads, included interviews with cellist Yo-Yo Ma, Muslim philosopher Tariq Ramadan, Muslim rapper Lupe Fiasco, Indian filmmaker Mira Nair, and Pakistani rock icon Salman Ahmad. "Electrons to Enlightenment", a five-part series on science and religion, included interviews with intellectual heavyweights E. O. Wilson, Richard Dawkins, Francis Collins, and Karen Armstrong.

To the Best of Our Knowledge won the 2004 Peabody Award for Programming.

References

External links 
 
 Archive website

Public Radio International programs
Peabody Award-winning radio programs